Johannes Gallicus can refer to:

 Johannes de Garlandia (music theorist) (fl. c. 1270-1320), French music theorist
 Johannes Gallicus (c. 1415-1473), French humanist and music theorist

See also
Johannes Galliculus (c. 1490-c. 1550), French composer